136th may refer to:

136th (2/1st Devon and Cornwall) Brigade, formation of the Territorial Force of the British Army
136th (Durham) Battalion, CEF, unit in the Canadian Expeditionary Force during the First World War
136th Airlift Squadron flies the C-130 Hercules
136th Airlift Wing, airlift unit located at Naval Air Station Joint Reserve Base Fort Worth
136th Delaware General Assembly, meeting of the legislative branch of the Delaware state government
136th Georgia General Assembly succeeded the 135th and served as the precedent for the 137th General Assembly in 1983
136th Illinois Volunteer Infantry Regiment, infantry regiment that served in the Union Army during the American Civil War
136th Infantry Regiment (United States), infantry regiment in the Army National Guard
136th Kentucky Derby or 2010 Kentucky Derby
136th meridian east, line of longitude across the Arctic Ocean, Asia, the Pacific Ocean, Australasia, the Indian Ocean, the Southern Ocean and Antarctica
136th meridian west, line of longitude across the Arctic Ocean, North America, the Pacific Ocean, the Southern Ocean and Antarctica
136th Observation Squadron, unit of the Tennessee Air National Guard 118th Airlift Wing
136th Ohio Infantry (or 136th OVI) was an infantry regiment in the Union Army during the American Civil War
136th Rifle Division (disambiguation), name given to three different divisions in the Red Army during World War II
136th Street (IRT Third Avenue Line), station on the demolished IRT Third Avenue Line
136th Street (Manhattan), New York
Pennsylvania's 136th Representative District or Pennsylvania House of Representatives, District 136

See also
136 (number)
AD 136, the year 136 (CXXXVI) of the Julian calendar
136 BC